Effingee Productions is a television production company known for its comedy in Scotland. It was created by Greg Hemphill and Ford Kiernan of Chewin' the Fat and Still Game.

TV Productions

External links
Effingee Productions

Television production companies of the United Kingdom
Scottish television comedy
2000 establishments in Scotland
Mass media companies established in 2000
Companies based in Glasgow
Mass media companies of Scotland